Vlahovići may refer to:

 Vlahovići, Ljubinje, a village in Bosnia and Herzegovina
 Vlahovići (Novo Goražde), a village in Bosnia and Herzegovina
 Vlahovići (Pale), a village in Bosnia and Herzegovina
 Vlahovići, Travnik, a village in Bosnia and Herzegovina
 Vlahovići (Višegrad), a village in Bosnia and Herzegovina

See also
 Vlahović, Croatia